The Canadian Journal of Physiology and Pharmacology (fr. Revue canadienne de physiologie et pharmacologie) is a monthly peer-reviewed scientific journal that reports the most current research in the fields of physiology, nutrition, pharmacology, and toxicology. Content is contributed to the magazine by recognized experts and scientists in the field. 

The magazine was established in 1964 after the split of Canadian Journal of Biochemistry and Physiology into two parts, the other one being Canadian Journal of Biochemistry. While the vast majority of its papers are in English, the journal also publishes in French. Abstracts for its papers are in both languages. The journal is published monthly by NRC Research Press.

The journal is affiliated with the Canadian Society of Pharmacology and Therapeutics, the Canadian Physiological Society, and the International Academy of Cardiovascular Sciences.

Abstracting and indexing 
The journal is abstracted and indexed in the following bibliographic databases:

External links

Publications established in 1964
Pharmacology journals
Physiology journals
Multilingual journals
Monthly journals
Canadian Science Publishing academic journals
Academic journals associated with learned and professional societies of Canada